Charles Quigley  (February 12, 1906 – August 5, 1964) was an American actor.

Early years
Born in New Britain, Connecticut, Quigley was the son of Charles P. Quigley, who was sales manager for a hardware business. He was a 1924 graduate of New Britain High School, and he attended the Academy of Dramatic Arts in New York.

Career 
On stage, Quigley acted for a year with a stock theater company in Portland, Maine, after which he worked with a touring company of Expressing Willie. He portrayed Christian for a year in a production of Cyrano de Bergerac and then was Ethel Barrymore's leading man for two years.

In Hollywood, Quigley starred in many serials and movies. He appeared opposite Rita Hayworth in several films including Convicted, Special Inspector, Girls Can Play and The Shadow, as well as in A Woman's Face with Joan Crawford. He also starred in The Crimson Ghost and appeared in the serial version of Superman (1948). His last performance was in Tokyo After Dark (1959).

On Broadway, Quigley appeared in False Dreams, Farewell (1934), The World Waits (1933), Her Tin Soldier (1933), Scarlet Sister Mary (1930), Diana (1929), The Bonds of Interest (1929), Cyrano de Bergerac (1928), Caponsacchi (1928), The Light of Asia (1928), and Arabian Nightmare (1927).

Quigley appeared on television a few times in the 1950s.

Personal life 
In 1928, Quigley married Harriet Blue. They had a son and a daughter were still wed at the time of his death.

Death
On August 5, 1964, Quigley died in Los Angeles at age 58.

Filmography

References 

Embattled shadows: a history of Canadian cinema, 1895-1939 by Peter Morris
 

1906 births
1964 deaths
American male film actors
20th-century American male actors
Male actors from Connecticut
People from New Britain, Connecticut
Film serial actors
American male stage actors
American male television actors